In Australia, a cunjevoi may mean:
 Alocasia brisbanensis also known as "native lily" or "spoon lily"
 Alocasia macrorrhizos or  "giant taro" or "elephant ear taro"
 Pyura praeputialis a Tunicate or sea squirt marine animal

Australian Aboriginal words and phrases